Geranomyia unicolor is a species of cranefly in the family Limoniidae. A coastal species, its larvae feed on green algae and lichens in the high tidal zone and splash zone.

References 

Limoniidae